Rin (written: , , , , , ,  in hiragana or  in katakana) is a unisex Japanese given name, sometimes transliterated as Lin or Lynn. Notable people with the name include:

, Japanese model and AV actress
, Japanese actress
, Japanese actress and model
, Japanese fashion model, actress and television personality
, Japanese poet
, Japanese Go player
, Japanese figure skater
, Japanese manga artist
, Japanese manga artist
, Japanese character designer, animator and illustrator
, Japanese women's footballer
, Japanese actress
, Japanese painter

Fictional characters 
Rin (凛), a main character in the music video Shelter
, a character in the video game Catherine: Full Body
, a supporting character in the manga series Inuyasha 
, protagonist of the anime series Lost Song
, a character in the anime series Yu-Gi-Oh! Arc-V
Rin, the protagonist of Tong Nou and Chu-Teng
, a character in the manga series Blade of the Immortal
, protagonist of the anime series Mnemosyne
, a character in the anime series Machine Robo Rescue
, a character in the anime series Cardfight!! Vanguard G
, a character in the media franchise Love Live!
, a character in the manga series Bunny Drop
, a Vocaloid from VOCALOID 2
, a character in the manga series Kodomo no Jikan
, a character in the manga series To Love-Ru
, a character in the anime series Free!
, a character in the anime series Yes! PreCure 5
, a character in the visual novel Little Busters!
, a character in the manga series Naruto
, protagonist of the manga series Blue Exorcist
, a character in the video game The Idolmaster Cinderella Girls
Rin Shima (志摩 リン), one of the protagonists of the anime series Laid-Back Camp
, a nickname for Isuzu Sohma, a character in the manga series Fruits Basket
, a character in the visual novel Katawa Shoujo
, a character in the visual novel Fate/stay night
, a character in the video game Akiba's Trip: Undead & Undressed 
, a character in the anime series New Game!
, protagonist of the visual novel Shuffle!
, a character in the manga series Blue Lock

References

Japanese unisex given names